{{DISPLAYTITLE:Vitamin K4}}
Vitamin K4 is a name for one or more specific compounds with vitamin K activity.

K4 may refer to menadiol or to various menadiol esters, like menadiol diacetate (acetomenaphthone), menadiol dibutyrate or menadiol dimalonate. K4 may also mean various phosphate or sulfate salts, like menadiol sodium diphosphate or menadiol sodium disulfate.

References

Vitamin K